Kadri Roshi (4 January 1924 – 6 February 2007) was an Albanian actor. He was named a People's Artist of Albania.

Filmography

References

External links 
 

1924 births
2007 deaths
Albanian male film actors
People's Artists of Albania
People from Mallakastër